Annekatrin Thiele (born 18 October 1984 in Sangerhausen) is a German rower. She competed at the 2008 Summer Olympics, where she won a silver medal in double sculls with Christiane Huth.  At the 2012 Summer Olympics, she again won a silver medal, this time in the women's quadruple sculls.  She has also twice won World Championship gold, both times in the women's quadruple sculls.  At the 2016 Summer Olympics in Rio de Janeiro she competed in women's quadruple sculls competition in which the German team won the gold medal.

References

External links 
 
 

Living people
Olympic gold medalists for Germany
Olympic silver medalists for Germany
Olympic rowers of Germany
Rowers at the 2008 Summer Olympics
Rowers at the 2012 Summer Olympics
Rowers at the 2016 Summer Olympics
Rowers at the 2020 Summer Olympics
1984 births
Olympic medalists in rowing
Medalists at the 2016 Summer Olympics
Medalists at the 2012 Summer Olympics
Medalists at the 2008 Summer Olympics
German female rowers
People from Sangerhausen
World Rowing Championships medalists for Germany
Sportspeople from Saxony-Anhalt